2012 OFC Women's Pre-Olympic Football Tournament was the qualifying tournament to the football competition at the 2012 Summer Olympics in London for the member nations of the Oceania Football Confederation. It was the third edition of the OFC Women's Olympic Qualifying Tournament. Four nations  participated in a preliminary tournament (hosted by Tonga) based on a league system with two advancing to a final. The winner of this preliminary stage played New Zealand in a home-and-away play-off for a place at the Olympics.

Participating teams

First stage
The teams' paths to the Olympics were revealed on 17 February 2012.

Round-robin

Knockout round

Third place play-off

Final

Awards
A number of awards were announced following the preliminary tournament.

Final stage

Summary

Matches

New Zealand won 15–0 on aggregate and qualified for the 2012 Summer Olympics.

References

See also
 Football at the 2012 Summer Olympics
 2012 OFC Men's Pre-Olympic Football Tournament

External links
 Official OFC website
 Official OFC competition schedule

OFC
2012
Oly